Mount Gilboa Chapel is a historic African Methodist Episcopal Church located in Oella, Baltimore County, Maryland. It is a small stone church measuring 28 feet by 42 feet, built about 1859 by free African Americans. The front façade is ashlar masonry, but the sides and rear are of rubble.

Background
The building is the replacement of an earlier log chapel of unknown origin. It is possible that neighbor Benjamin Banneker attended services in such a log building. An obelisk that the Maryland Bicentennial Commission and the State Commission on Afro American History and Culture erected in 1977 to commemorate Banneker stands in the church's yard near his unmarked grave.

The chapel was listed on the National Register of Historic Places in 1976.

References

External links
 
 

Churches on the National Register of Historic Places in Maryland
African Methodist Episcopal churches in Maryland
Churches in Baltimore County, Maryland
Churches completed in 1859
19th-century churches in the United States
African-American history of Baltimore County, Maryland
African-American cemeteries
Oella, Maryland
National Register of Historic Places in Baltimore County, Maryland
1859 establishments in Maryland
Benjamin Banneker